Rhys Howden (born 2 April 1987 in Brisbane) is an Australian water polo player who competed in the 2008, 2012 and 2016 Summer Olympics. He was the joint top sprinter at the 2012 Olympics, with 19 sprints won. He was also the top sprinter at the 2016 Olympics, with 18 sprints won.

Howden was picked in the water polo Sharks squad to compete in the men's water polo tournament at the 2020 Summer Olympics. Coached by  Elvis Fatović, the team finished joint fourth on points in their pool but their inferior goal average meant they finished fifth overall and out of medal contention. They were able to upset Croatia in a group stage match 11–8. Australia at the 2020 Summer Olympics details the results in depth.

See also
 Australia men's Olympic water polo team records and statistics

References

External links
 

1987 births
Living people
Australian male water polo players
Olympic water polo players of Australia
Water polo players at the 2008 Summer Olympics
Water polo players at the 2012 Summer Olympics
Water polo players at the 2016 Summer Olympics
Water polo players at the 2020 Summer Olympics
People from Brisbane
21st-century Australian people